The 1901–1902 Costa Rican general election occurred under growing political tensions.  The authoritarian government of Rafael Yglesias was in direct confrontation with the opposition and had re-elected himself as single-candidate in the previous election by a questionable constitutional reform. The liberal Republican Party represented the most staunch opposition and the country was on the edge of civil war. However, Yglesias managed to negotiate with the moderate branch of the Republicans for a peaceful power exchange.

This new election was called with two candidates: Ascensión Esquivel Ibarra from the newly formed National Union Party and Máximo Fernández Alvarado under the banner of the "Republican Club". Both liberals. Esquivel won by a large margin.

Results
Second grade electors, first round

1 Yglesias did not run, but some electors voted for him rather than for Esquivel.

Second grade electors, second round

References

Elections in Costa Rica
1902 elections in Central America
1902 in Costa Rica